Owens Creek may refer to:

Owens Creek (Kishwaukee River), a stream in Illinois
Owens Creek (Grand River), a stream in Missouri